Pseudodeltote is a genus of moths of the family Noctuidae.

Selected species
Pseudodeltote brunnea (Leech, 1889)
Pseudodeltote coenia (Swinhoe, 1901)
Pseudodeltote formosana (Hampson, 1910)
Pseudodeltote postvittata (Wileman, 1914)
Pseudodeltote subcoenia (Wileman & South, 1916)

References
Natural History Museum Lepidoptera genus database

Acontiinae